Lusitromina is a genus of sea snails, marine gastropod mollusks in the family Cominellidae.

Species
Species within the genus Lusitromina  include:
 Lusitromina abyssicola (A.H. Clarke, 1961)
 Lusitromina abyssorum (Lus, 1993)
Synonyms
 Lusitromina traverseensis (A.H. Clarke, 1961): synonym of Iphinopsis traverseensis (A.H. Clarke, 1961)

References

 Harasewych M.G. & Kantor Y.I. 2004. The deep-sea Buccinoidea (Gastropoda: Neogastropoda) of the Scotia Sea and adjacent abyssal plains and trenches.  The Nautilus 118(1): 1-42

Cominellidae